Alberto II della Scala (1306 – 13 September 1352) was lord of Verona from 1329 until his death. He was a member of the famous Scaliger family of northern Italy.

He was the son of Alboino I della Scala and Beatrice da Correggio. He co-ruled with his brother Mastino II until 1351. He lost Padua in 1338 and Belluno and Feltre in 1339.

After his death in Verona in 1352, he was succeeded by Mastino's sons.

Scala, Alberto 2
Scala, Alberto 2
Alberto 2
Burials at Santa Maria Antica, Verona
14th-century Italian nobility
Lords of Padua
Lords of Verona